Abdul-Fatah Nsaief Jassim (born 2 February 1951) is an Iraqi football goalkeeper who played for Iraq in the 1986 FIFA World Cup. He also played for Al-Jaish.

Fattah Nasaif was one of Iraq's best keepers in the 1970s and 1980s. He played one game in the 1986 World Cup against hosts Mexico and also was first choice in the 1980 Olympics in Moscow.

References

External links
 FIFA profile

1951 births
Iraqi footballers
Iraq international footballers
Association football goalkeepers
1986 FIFA World Cup players
Living people
Olympic footballers of Iraq
Footballers at the 1980 Summer Olympics
Footballers at the 1984 Summer Olympics